West Syriac Church or West Syriac church refers to a church that performs the West Syriac Rite.

 Syriac Orthodox Church, the Syriac Orthodox Patriarchate of Antioch
 Syriac Catholic Church, the Syriac Catholic Patriarchate of Antioch
 Syro-Maronite Catholic Church, the Maronite Catholic Patriarchate of Antioch
 Syro-Malankara Orthodox Church, uses Malankara variant of the West Syriac Rite
 Syro-Malabar Independent Church, uses variant of the West Syriac Rite
 Syro-Malankara Catholic Church, uses Malankara variant of the West Syriac Rite

See also
 West Syriac (disambiguation)
 East Syriac Church (disambiguation)
 Syriac Rite (disambiguation)
 Syriac (disambiguation)